Carbon Catabolite Repression—Negative On TATA-less, or CCR4-Not, is a multiprotein complex that functions in gene expression. The complex has multiple enzymatic activities as both a poly(A) 3′-5′ exonuclease and a ubiquitin ligase. The complex is present both in the nucleus where it regulates transcription and in the cytoplasm where it associates with translating ribosomes and RNA processing bodies.

Subunits 
The human CCR4-Not complex is composed of structural (non-catalytic) subunits and those that have exonuclease and E3 ligase activity. Some but not all of the human subunits are conserved in budding yeast.

Molecular weight of human subunits from Uniprot.

See also 
 Deadenylation
 Gene expression

References 

Gene expression
Molecular biology
Protein complexes
RNA-binding proteins